The Oldenburger OFFIS - Institut für Informatik (OFFIS - Institute for Information Technology) is a research institute located in the city of Oldenburg, Germany. The institute was founded on July 6, 1991 and works closely together with the Carl von Ossietzky University of Oldenburg. OFFIS is an application-oriented research and development institute and a centre of excellence for selected areas of information technology and its fields of application.

Organization 
The institute is divided in four research divisions Energy, Health, Society and Manufacturing. 
The Energy division focusses on energy management and the energy efficiency of digital systems. 
In the Health division research focusses on enabling humans to live in a condition of full physical, mental, and social well-being. 
The Society division focusses on technological innovations for a sustainable digital society and the associated design framework in science, business and politics. 
The Manufacturing division transfers its ICT competences for industry 4.0 from practice-oriented research into the economy so that it can actively participate in shaping the digital transformation.

Alongside the four application oriented departments the institute established seven technology-focussed competence clusters:
Architecture Frameworks (AF)
Cyber Resilient Architectures and Security (CRAS)
Deep Learning (DL)
Embedded System Design (ESD)
Human Machine Cooperation (HMC)
Multi-Scale Multi-Rate Simulation (MS²)
Safety Relevant Cyber Physical Systems (SRCPS)
Sustainability

Executive Board 

The OFFIS executive board has three members:
 Prof. Dr. Sebastian Lehnhoff (Chairman)
 Prof. Dr. Susanne Boll
 Prof. Dr.-Ing. Andreas Hein

External links 
 OFFIS - Institute for Information Technology

Laboratories in Germany
Scientific organisations based in Germany
Computer science institutes in Germany
1991 establishments in Germany